Macaduma albisparsa is a moth of the subfamily Arctiinae. It was described by George Hampson in 1914. It is found on New Guinea.

References

Moths described in 1914
Macaduma